Dehnow-e Ansari (also Romanized as Dehnow-e Ānṣārī; also known as Dehnow-e Sardegal) is a village in Fahraj Rural District, in the Central District of Fahraj County, Kerman Province, Iran. At the 2006 census, its population was 300, in 75 families.

References 

Populated places in Fahraj County